This is a list of diplomatic missions in Suriname. There are currently 10 embassies in Paramaribo; (not including honorary consulates).

Diplomatic missions in Paramaribo

Consulates-General in Suriname
Nickerie

Non-Resident Embassies 

  (Caracas)
  (Georgetown)
  (Port of Spain)
  (Port of Spain)
  (Brasília)
  (Port of Spain)
  (Caracas)
  (Port of Spain)
  (Port of Spain)
  (New York City)
  (New York City)
  (Jerusalem) 
  (Brasília)
  (Caracas)
 (Port of Spain)
  (Brasília)
  (Port of Spain)
  (Caracas)
  (Brasília)
  (Brasília)
  (Brasília)
  (Brasília)
  (Washington, D.C.)
  (Port of Spain)
  (Caracas)
  (Georgetown)
  (Port of Spain)
  (Georgetown)
  (Brasília)

See also
 Foreign relations of Suriname
 List of diplomatic missions of Suriname

References

 Embassy of Suriname in Washington DC

 
Suriname
Diplomatic missions